Alonso de Sandoval (7 December 1576 - 25 December 1652) was a Spanish Jesuit priest and missionary in Colombia. He devoted most of his life to the evangelization of Black slaves arriving in the Colombian port city of Cartagena, and was the mentor of Saint Peter Claver. He is also known for his treatise De Instauranda Æthiopum Salute, a major contribution to the study of the slave trade and the condition of Black slaves in Cartagena.

Life

Sandoval was born in Seville in 1576. He followed his parents who emigrated to Peru, where his father was appointed accountant at the Royal Treasury of Lima. He studied there, initially at the seminary of Saint Martin. On 30 June 1595 he entered the Lima novitiate of the Society of Jesus.

In 1605, he joined the Jesuit college that had just been founded in Cartagena, and spent the rest of his life there except for a brief stay in Lima from 1617 to 1619.

He himself called his lifetime service the ministerio de los morenos, ministry of the Blacks. He had come to realize that most of the black slaves who landed by the hundreds in the port of Cartagena were forcibly baptized before receiving any religious instruction. The apostolate he led to them for 45 years enabled Father Sandoval to personally baptize forty thousand blacks.

Before leaving for Lima in 1617, he trained Peter Claver to take over, and was later Peters' mentor and advisor. During his stay in Lima, he began to collect documentation and bibliography on Africa, compiling both accounts of ancient writers and studies of other Jesuit fathers. He died aged 76 in Cartagena.

De Instauranda Æthiopum Salute

During his stay in Lima, Sandoval began to write his work Naturaleza, policia sagrada y profana, costumbres y ritos, disciplina y catecismo evangélico de todos etíopes, which he completed in 1623. The work was printed in Seville in 1627. A second edition in 1647 came with the Latin title De Instauranda Æthiopum Salute.

Both the title and the conception of the book seem to have been inspired by the work of another Jesuit, José de Acosta, whose De Procuranda Indorum Salute was published in Salamanca in 1589. In that treatise on evangelization in America with considerations on the indigenous peoples of Peru, Acosta posits that the success of the missionary depends on his capacity to be flexible, pragmatic and adaptable in his relations with future converts. Sandoval followed Acosta's example in his missionary manual.

In the four books of De Instauranda Æthiopum Salute, Sandoval presented the available historical and geographical knowledge on the African world, a description of the suffering of slaves with an admonition to cruel owners, a practical guide for Jesuit missionaries, completed by a call to the Jesuits to serve with Africans in America.

De Instauranda is considered one of the most important texts for the ethnography of African slavery in Iberian America, along with the works of the Portuguese Jesuits António Vieira (1608-1697) and Jorge Benci (1650-1708).

See also
 Bartolomé de las Casas

Notes

1576 births
1652 deaths
Spanish Jesuits
Jesuit missionaries
Roman Catholic missionaries in Colombia